George Potts (1807 – 20 September 1863) was a British Liberal and Conservative politician.

Potts was the son of William Potts and Mary (née Bayly), daughter of William Bayly. He married three times, including to his cousin Ellen ńee Reed, daughter of James Reed, in 1847. He had at least two sons including Dr Walter Jeffery Potts (1837–1898), who married Julia Beevor and had at least one son, Charles Herbert Beevor-Potts (1864–1953), a leading magistrate in Nanaimo, Vancouver Island, Canada.

Potts first stood for election at Barnstaple at the 1857 general election as a Peelite Conservative—or Liberal Conservative—but was unsuccessful. He again stood for the seat at the next general election in 1859, joining the Liberal Party after its formation, and held the seat until his death in 1863.

References

External links
 

UK MPs 1859–1865
1807 births
1863 deaths
Liberal Party (UK) MPs for English constituencies
Members of the Parliament of the United Kingdom for Barnstaple